Krishnagiri Stadium is a cricket stadium in Wayanad, Kerala. The stadium is located in Krishnagiri Village in the Indian state of Kerala. It holds up to 20,000 people, and at 2,100 feet above sea level, it is the highest-altitude stadium used exclusively for cricket.

History 

The stadium site was purchased in 2006, and the foundation stone was laid in 2009 by former Indian cricket players Robin Singh and Sunil Joshi. It was dedicated by Governor Nikhil Kumar at Krishnagiri in Wayanad in 2013. The stadium has hosted four first-class matches, including two between India A and South Africa.

Features 

 11.5 acres
 Two-foot slanted height accelerates drainage 
 Grass viewing mound and a viewing gallery in the form of a sloped lawn for seating.  
 Main coaching center for cricket in the state (Kerala).

References

External links 

 Krishna Stadium
 Hotel Great Jubilee
 Cricket archive
 Cricinfo

Cricket grounds in Kerala
Buildings and structures in Wayanad district
Sports venues completed in 2013
2013 establishments in Kerala